"The Only One" was the second single to be taken from Transvision Vamp's second studio album Velveteen. It was a UK Top 20 hit in 1989 and peaked at #15, spending a total of six weeks on the chart. The sleeve design was similar to that of the previous single "Baby I Don't Care", this time featuring the band against a panelled backdrop printed with a large photo of Marilyn Monroe.

Critical reception
Eleanor Levy left positive review on this single for British music newspaper Record Mirror. She called it "messy pop rock'n'roll" with "feisty little tune".

Track listing
7" vinyl (TVV 7) 
"The Only One" (7" Version) - 3:50
"The Mystery Song" (Dave Parsons) - 3:18
"Love Me" (Anthony Doughty) - 3:17

12" vinyl (TVVT 7) 
"The Only One" (Extended Mix) - 5:50
"The Mystery Song" - 3:18
"Love Me" - 3:17

CD single (DTVVT 7) 
"The Only One" (7" Version) - 3:50
"The Mystery Song" - 3:18
"Love Me" - 3:17
"The Only One" (Extended Mix) - 5:50

Charts

References

External links
http://www.itm-ed.de/tvamp/music/discography/onlyone.html Worldwide releases

1989 singles
Transvision Vamp songs
1989 songs
MCA Records singles